Joseph Mosley Root (October 7, 1807 – April 7, 1879) was a U.S. Representative from Ohio.

Life and career
The son of Joseph Root III & Tryphena Mosley he was born October 7, 1807, in Brutus, New York. Root pursued classical studies and later studied law in Auburn, New York.  He moved to Ohio in 1829, where he was admitted to the bar in 1830 and commenced practice in Norwalk.

In 1832-1833, Root was Mayor of Sandusky, Ohio. In 1835, Root married Mary S. Buckingham in Norwalk. They had five daughters.  Root was elected prosecuting attorney of Huron County in 1837.  He served as a member of the State Senate in 1840 and 1841.

Root was elected as a Whig to the Twenty-ninth Congress.
He was reelected to the Thirtieth Congress and reelected as a Free-Soil candidate to the Thirty-first Congress (March 4, 1845 – March 3, 1851). In 1848, he introduced a resolution that recommended New Mexico and California have territorial governments which excluded slavery.
He served as chairman of the Committee on Expenditures in the Department of the Treasury (Thirtieth Congress).
He served as Presidential elector on the Republican ticket in 1860.
He was appointed United States Attorney for the northern district of Ohio in 1861.
He was again a member of the Ohio Senate in 1869.
He served as Democratic delegate to the State constitutional convention in 1873.
He was an unsuccessful Democratic candidate for probate judge of Erie County in 1875.

Death and legacy 
He died in Sandusky, Ohio, April 7, 1879.
He was interred in Oakland Cemetery.

The Joseph Root House in Sandusky may have been a "safe house" on the Underground Railroad, and is listed on the National Register of Historic Places.

Sources

External links

 

1807 births
1879 deaths
People from Brutus, New York
Whig Party members of the United States House of Representatives from Ohio
Ohio Free Soilers
Free Soil Party members of the United States House of Representatives from Ohio
Ohio Republicans
Ohio Democrats
1860 United States presidential electors
Ohio state senators
Ohio Constitutional Convention (1873)
People from Norwalk, Ohio
Ohio lawyers
People from Sandusky, Ohio
United States Attorneys for the Northern District of Ohio
County district attorneys in Ohio
Mayors of places in Ohio
19th-century American politicians
19th-century American lawyers